Moving Target is the début album by the band Moving Target, headed by frontman Simon Townshend, the younger brother of The Who's guitarist Pete Townshend. The album, released by the label Polydor Records in 1985, Moving Target was Moving Target's only release, and was a commercial failure. It also marked the end of the career for the band, but is often counted among Townshend's discography, sometimes credited as a solo effort (since the band Moving Target formed and disbanded around this single effort).

The album was produced by Neil Kernon, a Grammy Award-winning producer who has contributed to over 40 Gold and Platinum records. This album is one of three albums produced by Kernon in 1985.

The band "Moving Target" features Simon Townshend playing guitar, Andy Shillito playing bass guitar, Dane Morrell playing drums and Paul Rogers playing keyboards. The band once played live at the rock club The Ritz in New York City on which they played the tracks "Meet You", "Frustrated Hearts", "Addictions", and "Genuine" from this album as well as "I'm the Answer" from Sweet Sound and a new track "Broken Heart" which was not recorded until 1987 when it was released as a single.
A second record was to have been released on the label Atlantic Records, but the label kept Simon Townshend busy remixing and re-recording under their contract, they never seemed pleased with the results. Once that the contract was over, Simon Townshend reformed "On the Air". only this time instead of Tony Butler, he recruited Andy Shilito, the bassist he had worked with on his earlier albums.

In 1988, Simon Townshend held a record release party for his first album as the band "On the Air". They performed most of the new tracks in a London club before an audience that included his Mother, Pete Townshend, Martin Chambers of The Pretenders, and many others. The party was a great success. However, the next day a legal injunction was slapped on the album and it could not be released. Some copies of the single are around.

Track listing
All tracks written by Simon Townshend.
Side One

Side Two

Non-album track
 House on Fire (The B- side for the single "Barriers")

Personnel
 Simon Townshend - Lead vocals, guitar
 Andy Shillito - Bass Guitar, backing vocals
 Dane Morrell - Drums, percussion
 Paul Rogers - Keyboards
Production
 Neil Kernon - Record producer
Engineering
 Mark Corbijn - Engineer [Assistant]
 John Luongo - Remixing
 Simon Townshend - Programming

References

1985 debut albums
Simon Townshend albums
Polydor Records albums
Ark 21 Records albums
Albums produced by Neil Kernon